Heathcote-Drummond-Willoughby is a surname. Notable people with the surname include:

Claud Heathcote-Drummond-Willoughby (1872–1950), British Conservative Party politician
Charles Strathavon Heathcote-Drummond-Willoughby (1870–1949), British army officer
Gilbert Heathcote-Drummond-Willoughby (disambiguation), several people
James Heathcote-Drummond-Willoughby, 3rd Earl of Ancaster (1907–1983), British Conservative politician
Jane Heathcote-Drummond-Willoughby, 28th Baroness Willoughby de Eresby PC (born 1934), the daughter of the 3rd Earl of Ancaster

See also
Heathcote (surname)
Drummond (surname)
Willoughby (surname)

Compound surnames
Surnames of English origin
Surnames of Scottish origin